Joan Sagalés (born 15 November 1959) is a Spanish handball player. He competed in the men's tournament at the 1988 Summer Olympics.

References

1959 births
Living people
Spanish male handball players
Olympic handball players of Spain
Handball players at the 1988 Summer Olympics
Sportspeople from Barcelona